Sophie Kennedy Clark (born 1990) is a Scottish actress. She is the daughter of actress and singer Fiona Kennedy and the granddaughter of singer Calum Kennedy.

Career
Her first big break came when she starred as David Tennant's eldest daughter in the television series Single Father. She next went on to do theatre in London's Southwark Playhouse in Eight Women and had appeared in a handful of projects including Lauren in the episode of Black Mirror entitled "The National Anthem". In 2012, she made a short appearance in Dark Shadows, with Johnny Depp. She also appeared in Stephen Frears' film Philomena (2013) and in Lars von Trier's film Nymphomaniac (2014).

Filmography

Films
Dark Shadows (2012), Hippie Chick 1
Philomena (2013), Young Philomena
Nymphomaniac (2014), B
Stonehearst Asylum (2014), Millie
The Danish Girl (2015), Ursula
Tomorrow (2016), Lee-Anne
Go North (2017)
Obey (2018), Twiggy
Venice at Dawn (2022)

Television
Single Father as Tanya (2010)
Black Mirror as Lauren (2011)
The Marriage of Reason & Squalor as Lydia (2015)
The Cry as Kirsty (2018)
Urban Myths: Madonna and Basquiat as Madonna (2019)

References

External links
 

1990 births
21st-century Scottish actresses
Scottish stage actresses
Scottish film actresses
Scottish television actresses
Actresses from Aberdeen
Living people
People from Aberdeen